St. Michael's Church is a parish of the Roman Catholic Church in Remuera, Auckland, New Zealand. It is known for its heritage parish church completed in 1933. The parish also operates St Michael's Catholic School, an integrated primary school established in 1916.

History 
The church was designed by George Tole and Horace Massey. It opened in 1933 and was awarded the NZIA gold medal the same year. It was registered as a historic place on 2 April 1985, with registration number 118.

References

External links
 
 St Michael's Church, Remuera, Heritage New Zealand listing description 

Heritage New Zealand Category 1 historic places in the Auckland Region
Listed churches in New Zealand
1930s architecture in New Zealand
Roman Catholic churches completed in 1933
1933 in New Zealand
Basilica churches in New Zealand
1933 establishments in New Zealand
20th-century Roman Catholic church buildings in New Zealand
Michael's Catholic Church
Romanesque architecture in New Zealand